Mpohor is the administrative capital of the Mpohor District in the Western Region of Ghana.
It has been the capital of the district since its creation in 2012.

The town is at an elevation of 74 metre above sea level.

Mpohor is located north west of Sekondi-Takoradi.

See also 
 Mpohor District

References

External links
2010 Population and Housing Census - District Analytic Report - Mpohor District

Populated places in the Western Region (Ghana)